Ronald Johnson (20 May 1938 – 15 February 2023) was an Australian rules footballer who played with Richmond in the Victorian Football League (VFL).

Johnson was a teacher in the Victorian Technical School system in the plumbing/sheet metal area. He was coach of the Burwood Technical School Year 7 & Year 8 Shell Lightning Premiership Teams taking the 1979 & 1980 teams to runners up in the State.

References

External links 

1938 births
2023 deaths
Australian rules footballers from Victoria (Australia)
Richmond Football Club players